Hala El-Gohari (born 4 May 1996) is an Egyptian sports shooter. She competed in the women's 10 metre air pistol event at the 2020 Summer Olympics.

References

External links
 

1996 births
Living people
Egyptian female sport shooters
Olympic shooters of Egypt
Shooters at the 2020 Summer Olympics
Place of birth missing (living people)
21st-century Egyptian women